Don't Quit Your Day Job! is the debut studio album by American rapper Consequence. It was released on GOOD Music and Columbia Records on March 6, 2007. The album features the song "Grammy Family", a song with DJ Khaled featuring Kanye West and John Legend, which also appeared on DJ Khaled's debut album "Listennn... the Album" and was released as a single in 2006. Guest appearances on the album include Kanye West, John Legend, Really Doe and GLC.

In the album's first week, it sold 7,490 units, while also debuting at #1 on the "Billboard" New Artist chart. After criticism of the album, Consequence offered a refund deal on his MySpace page, claiming that anyone who purchased the album and didn’t like any of the songs could contact him and get their money back.

Reception 
William Ketchum of HipHopDX gave the album three stars out of five, saying: "Despite its drawbacks, Don't Quit Your Day Job! is still a solid debut from Consequence and another winner in the GOOD Music catalog."

Track listing 

Sample Credits

"Job Song" contains a sample of "Nautilus" performed by Bob James
"Don't Forget 'Em" contains samples of "Catavento" performed by Milton Nascimento and "Tone 10" performed by Takumi Kato
"The Good, the Bad, the Ugly" contains a samples of "I Wish You Were Here" performed by Al Green and "Mickey's Monkey" performed by The Miracles
"Pretty Little Sexy Mama" contains a sample of Trying to Hold on to My Woman" performed by Lamont Dozier
"Disperse" contains a sample of "The World Is a Place" performed by Rhythm
"Grammy Family" contains samples of "You've Made Me So Very Happy" performed by Lou Rawls and "What the World Is Coming To" performed by Dexter Wansel
Good News, Bad News" (skit) and "Who Knew My Luck Would Change?" contain a sample of "Love Won't Let Me Wait" performed by Luther Vandross

Charts

References

External links 
 

2007 debut albums
Consequence (rapper) albums
Albums produced by Kanye West
Albums produced by Karriem Riggins
Columbia Records albums
GOOD Music albums